Biggleswade Castle was a castle in the market town of Biggleswade in Bedfordshire.

The existence of this castle was discovered by aerial photography, in 1954, which showed the remains of a motte and bailey castle with a double ditch around the motte and a single ditch around the bailey.

Some excavation of the site was done in 1962 and 1968. The excavations found evidence of timber structures, as well as pottery.

Only cropmarks and slight earthworks remain. This site is a Scheduled Monument.

See also
Stratton Park Moated Enclosure
Castles in Great Britain and Ireland
List of castles in England

References

Fry, Plantagenet Somerset, The David & Charles Book of Castles, David & Charles, 1980.

External links 
 English Heritage Monument No. 362741
 Investigation History
 English Heritage cropmarks 2010

Castles in Bedfordshire
Scheduled monuments in Bedfordshire
Biggleswade
Buildings and structures in Biggleswade